Cliona is a genus of demosponges in the family Clionaidae. It contains about eighty described species.

Species
Species in this genus include:

 Cliona acephala Zea & López-Victoria, 2016
 Cliona adriatica Calcinai, Bavestrello, Cuttone & Cerrano, 2011
 Cliona aethiopicus Burton, 1932
 Cliona albimarginata Calcinai, Bavestrello & Cerrano, 2005
 Cliona amplicavata Rützler, 1974
 Cliona annulifera Annandale, 1915
 Cliona aprica Pang, 1973
 Cliona argus Thiele, 1898
 Cliona barbadensis Holmes, 2000
 Cliona burtoni Topsent, 1932
 Cliona caesia (Schönberg, 2000)
 Cliona caledoniae van Soest & Beglinger, 2009
 Cliona californiana de Laubenfels, 1932
 Cliona caribbaea Carter, 1882
 Cliona carteri (Ridley, 1881)
 Cliona celata Grant, 1826
 Cliona chilensis Thiele, 1905
 Cliona delitrix Pang, 1973
 Cliona desimoni Bavestrello, Calcinai & Sarà, 1995
 Cliona dioryssa (de Laubenfels, 1950)
 Cliona dissimilis Ridley & Dendy, 1886
 Cliona diversityla Sarà, 1978
 Cliona dubbia (Duchassaing & Michelotti, 1864)
 Cliona ecaudis Topsent, 1932
 Cliona ensifera Sollas, 1878
 Cliona euryphylle Topsent, 1888
 Cliona favus Calcinai, Bavestrello & Cerrano, 2005
 Cliona flavifodina Rützler, 1974
 Cliona infrafoliata (Thiele, 1898)
 Cliona insidiosa Hancock, 1849
 Cliona janitrix Topsent, 1932
 Cliona johannae Topsent, 1932
 Cliona johnstoni (Carter, 1886)
 Cliona jullieni Topsent, 1891
 Cliona kempi Annandale, 1915
 Cliona labiata (Keller, 1880)
 Cliona langae Pang, 1973
 Cliona latens (Duchassaing & Michelotti, 1864)
 Cliona laticavicola Pang, 1973
 Cliona lesueuri Topsent, 1888
 Cliona liangae Calcinai, Bavestrello & Cerrano, 2005
 Cliona lisa Cuartas, 1991
 Cliona lobata Hancock, 1849
 Cliona macgeachi Holmes, 2000
 Cliona medinae Cruz-Barraza, Carballo, Bautista-Guerrero & Nava, 2011
 Cliona michelini Topsent, 1887
 Cliona microstrongylata Carballo & Cruz-Barra, 2005
 Cliona millepunctata Hancock, 1849
 Cliona minuscula Schönberg, Grass & Heiermann, 2006
 Cliona mucronata Sollas, 1878
 Cliona nodulosa Calcinai, Cerrano, Sarà & Bavestrello, 2000
 Cliona orientalis Thiele, 1900
 Cliona papillae Carballo, Cruz-Barra & Gomez, 2004
 Cliona parenzani Corriero & Scalera-Liaci, 1997
 Cliona patera (Hardwicke, 1822)
 Cliona paucispina Rützler, 1974
 Cliona peponacea Pang, 1973
 Cliona phallica Leidy, 1889
 Cliona pocillopora Bautista-Guerrero, Carballo, Cruz-Barraza & Nava, 2006
 Cliona radiata Hancock, 1849
 Cliona raphida Boury-Esnault, 1973
 Cliona raromicrosclera (Dickinson, 1945)
 Cliona reticulata Ise & Fujita, 2005
 Cliona rhodensis Rützler & Bromley, 1981
 Cliona schmidti (Ridley, 1881)
 Cliona spissaspira Corriero & Nonnis Marzano, 2006
 Cliona subulata Sollas, 1878
 Cliona tenuis Zea & Weil, 2003
 Cliona thomasi Mote, Schönberg, Samaai, Gupta, Ingole, 2019
 Cliona thoosina Topsent, 1888
 Cliona tinctoria Schönberg, 2000
 Cliona topsenti (Lendenfeld, 1897)
 Cliona tropicalis Cruz-Barraza, Carballo, Bautista-Guerrero & Nava, 2011
 Cliona tumula Friday, Poppell & Hill, 2013
 Cliona undulata (George & Wilson, 1919)
 Cliona utricularis Calcinai, Bavestrello & Cerrano, 2005
 Cliona valentis (de Laubenfels, 1957)
 Cliona vallartense Carballo, Cruz-Barraza & Gomez, 2004
 Cliona varians (Duchassaing & Michelotti, 1864)
 Cliona vermifera Hancock, 1867
 Cliona viridis (Schmidt, 1862)

References

Hadromerida
Sponge genera